Chrysoscinia is a monotypic snout moth genus. Its single species, Chrysoscinia plicata, is found in New Guinea. Both the genus and species were described by George Hampson in 1930.

References

Phycitinae
Monotypic moth genera
Moths of Oceania